Nut Grove is a village in Saint John Parish, Antigua and Barbuda.

Demographics 
Nut Grove has one enumeration district, 12700 Nut Grove.

Census Data (2011)

Individual

Household 
There are 79 households in Nut Grove.

References 

Populated places in Antigua and Barbuda
Saint John Parish, Antigua and Barbuda